The Audience's Listening is the debut studio album by Cut Chemist, released on Warner Bros. Records on July 11, 2006. It features guest appearances from Hymnal, Edan, Mr. Lif, and Thes One.

Production
After leaving Jurassic 5 in 2004, Cut Chemist spent 18 months working exclusively on the album, which he had already been working on for 2 years. He spent almost a year clearing samples.

Critical reception
At Metacritic, which assigns a weighted average score out of 100 to reviews from mainstream critics, the album received an average score of 79% based on 15 reviews, indicating "generally favorable reviews".

David Jeffries of AllMusic gave the album 3.5 stars out of 5 and described it as "a well-crafted, highly enjoyable effort that overcomes the 'all samples cleared' challenge all big-label turntablist albums must face." Jeff Vrabel of PopMatters gave the album 7 stars out of 10, saying, "It's DJ music for the casual fan, something you don't need to be a knob-twiddler or connoisseur of the break beat to appreciate or enjoy."

In 2015, Vice named it the 49th greatest dance album of all time.

Track listing

Charts

References

External links
 

2006 debut albums
Cut Chemist albums
Warner Records albums